This is a list of tallest buildings in Winnipeg, the capital and largest city in Manitoba, Canada.

As of 2011, Winnipeg had 143 completed high-rise buildings, with 5 more under construction, 3 approved for construction, and 2 proposed.

History 
Winnipeg's history of towers began with the Union Bank Tower (1904), the National Bank Building (1911), and the Hotel Fort Garry in 1913. Buildings in the city remained relatively short in the city until the late 1960s when the city experienced its first skyscraper boom, with the construction of the Richardson Building, Holiday Towers, and Grain Exchange Tower, all being constructed during this time. From 1980 to 1990, Winnipeg witnessed a major expansion of skyscraper and high-rise construction. Many of the city's office towers were completed during this period, such as Canwest Place and the Evergreen Place towers. A 20-year lull in building construction came after this expansion, though Winnipeg has experienced a much smaller second building expansion beginning in the late 2000s and continuing into the present.

The most recent tall building to be constructed in Winnipeg is the Canadian Museum for Human Rights, which opened in 2014. , there are 5 high-rises under construction, approved for construction, and proposed for construction in Winnipeg.
 Once completed in 2021, the Artis Reit Residential Tower (300 Main st) will become Winnipeg's tallest building.

Tallest buildings
This includes spires and architectural details but does not include antenna masts.

Projects

This is a list of projects over  that are under construction, approved, on-hold and proposed in the city of Winnipeg.

Timeline of tallest buildings

See also

 Winnipeg arts and culture
 Canadian Centre for Architecture
 Society of Architectural Historians
 Canadian architecture
 List of tallest buildings in Canada
 List of tallest buildings in Saskatoon
 List of tallest buildings in Regina

References

External links
 Emporis.com - Winnipeg

 
Winnipeg
Buildings, Tallest
Tallest buildings in Winnipeg